Hizeh Jan (also Romanized as Hīzeh Jān; also known as Henreh Jān) is a village in Sina Rural District, in the Central District of Varzaqan County, East Azerbaijan Province, Iran. At the 2006 census, its population was 56, in 12 families.

References 

Towns and villages in Varzaqan County